The 2004 ICC Champions Trophy was held in England in September 2004. Twelve teams competed in 15 matches spread over 16 days at three venues: Edgbaston, The Rose Bowl and The Oval.
The nations competing included the ten Test nations, Kenya (ODI status), and – making their One Day International debut – the United States who qualified by winning the 2004 ICC Six Nations Challenge by the smallest of margins (coming down to net run rate over Canada, Namibia, and the Netherlands who had all recently played in the 2003 Cricket World Cup).

The ICC Champions Trophy was won by the West Indies in front of a sell-out Oval crowd. Ramnaresh Sarwan was named the Player of the Tournament.

Participating nations

 Group A: Australia, New Zealand, United States
 Group B: South Africa, West Indies, Bangladesh
 Group C: Pakistan, India, Kenya
 Group D: Sri Lanka, England, Zimbabwe

Group stage

Group A

Group B

Group C

Group D

Knock-out stage

Semi-finals

Final

Statistics

Most runs

Most wickets

References

External links

 
ICC Champions Trophy tournaments
International cricket competitions in 2004
Icc Champions Trophy